The Independent Chronicle (1776–1840) was a newspaper in Boston, Massachusetts.  It originated in 1768 as The Essex Gazette, founded by Samuel Hall (v.1–7) in Salem, and The New-England Chronicle (v.7–9) in Cambridge, before settling in 1776 in Boston as The Independent Chronicle.  Publishers also included Edward E. Powars, Nathaniel Willis, and Adams & Rhoades; Capt. Thomas Adams (ca.1757–1799) was the editor prior to his death in 1799. For some time it operated from offices on Court Street formerly occupied by James Franklin.  As of the 1820s, "the Chronicle [was] the oldest newspaper ... published in Boston; and has long been considered one of the principal republican papers in the state; and its influence has, at all times, been in exact proportion to the popularity of the cause which it has so warmly espoused." After 1840 the paper continued as the Boston Semi-weekly Advertiser published by Nathan Hale.

Variant titles
Volumes 1–9
 The Essex Gazette (Salem): Vol. 1, no. 1 (Aug. 2, 1768)-v. 7, no. 353 (Apr. 25 – May 2, 1775)
 The New-England Chronicle, or, the Essex Gazette (Cambridge): Vol. 7, no. 354 (May 2–12, 1775)-v. 8, no. 400 (Mar. 28-Apr. 4, 1776)
 The New-England Chronicle (Boston): Vol. 8, no. 401 (Apr. 25, 1776)-v. 9, no. 411 [i.e. 421] (Sept. 12, 1776)

Volumes 9–77
 The Independent Chronicle: Vol. 9, no. 422 (Sept. 19, 1776)-v. 9, no. 428 (Oct. 31, 1776)
 The Independent Chronicle and the Universal Advertiser:  Vol. 9, no. 429 (Nov. 7, 1776)-v. 33, no. 2162 (Dec. 14–17, 1801)
 The Independent Chronicle: Vol. 33, no. 2163 (Dec. 21, 1801)-v. 49, no. 3768 (May 29, 1817)
 Independent Chronicle & Boston Patriot: Vol. 49, no. 3769 (June 4, 1817)-v. 77, no. 6166 (May 23, 1840)

Image gallery

See also
Columbian Centinel
 Early American publishers and printers
 Bibliography of early American publishers and printers

References

Further reading
 Boston Newspapers. Boston News-Letter. Sept. 23, 1826; p. 133+

1776 establishments in Massachusetts
Newspapers published in Boston
Defunct newspapers published in Massachusetts
19th century in Boston
18th century in Boston
Publications established in 1776
Publications disestablished in 1840
1840 disestablishments in Massachusetts
Newspapers of colonial America